Isorrhoa is a genus of moths in the family Cosmopterigidae.

Species
Isorrhoa aetheria (Meyrick, 1897)
Isorrhoa ancistrota (Turner, 1923)
Isorrhoa antimetra Meyrick, 1913
Isorrhoa aphrosema (Meyrick, 1897)
Isorrhoa atmozona Turner, 1917
Isorrhoa implicata Meyrick, 1920
Isorrhoa loxoschema Turner, 1923
Isorrhoa triloxias (Meyrick, 1907)

References
Natural History Museum Lepidoptera genus database

Cosmopteriginae